Airpower or air power consists of the application of military aviation, military strategy and strategic theory to the realm of aerial warfare and close air support. Airpower began in  the advent of powered flight early in the 20th century. Airpower represents a "complex operating environment that has been subjected to considerable debate". British doctrine defines airpower as "the ability to project power from the air and space to influence the behaviour of people or the course of events." The Australian Experience of Air Power defines Airpower as being composed of Control of the Air, Strike, Intelligence Surveillance and Reconnaissance, and Air Mobility roles.

Definition 

Airpower can be considered a function of air supremacy and numbers. Roughly speaking, a combatant side that has 100% or near 100% control of the skies has air supremacy; an advantage of some 70–90% would indicate air superiority. A 50/50 split is air parity; lower than this, one side may be said to be air denied or air incapable. Because aeroplanes generally take off from designed airfields on missions typically involving some hours of cruising, the precise state of air superiority is fluid and less defined vis-a-vis land or sea warfare. For example, a contested airspace directly above a battlespace bristling with anti-aircraft weapons may be denied to the air forces of both sides. Further, the completely different situations of a technologically advanced airforce with one flight of high-tech planes (air supremacy but low capacity) or a low-tech force of massive numbers of low-tech planes (e.g., An-2) resulting in high capacity but low long-term survivability demonstrate that 'air power' is multi-faceted and complex.

Significant contributors to theorizing about air power have been Giulio Douhet, Billy Mitchell, John Boyd and John A. Warden III.

At the start of World War I, opinions differed on the national air forces and the value of airships.
Some early strategists/visionaries after World War I imagined that airpower alone would suffice to bring nations to their knees. The Bombing of Guernica was an early trial that revealed both capabilities and limitations. But yet another maxim, "no war was ever won solely by airpower" was challenged by the NATO victory in Kosovo. Airpower has been used to conduct lightning strategic strikes, to complement land offensives, to instill fear and lower morale similarly to a fleet in being, and to create broad-based destruction behind enemy lines. With airpower, supplies can be transported by cargo planes, providing a decisive edge in mobility.

Military and civilian aircraft interact in a number of complex ways, including shootdowns of civilian planes, whether mistaken or not; military escorts of civilian planes; civilian planes being used for military transport, espionage, or other purposes; and/or no-fly zones being enforced to punish or sanction a target nation. Airpower also relates to space power, although militarization of space remains regulated by international treaty.

Developed nations have enjoyed a consistent advantage in airpower since the beginning of mechanized flight. Airpower has been wielded mostly decisively in the last hundred years by Nazi Germany, the United Kingdom, the United States, the Soviet Union, Japan, Italy, and France, with many client nations using aircraft developed by one or more of these nations. A mass technological base is considered necessary for the development of airpower.

Notes

Further reading
 Baner, Carl. "Defining Aerospace Power", Air and Space Power Journal, March 11, 1999 online
 Black, Jeremy. Air Power: A Global History  (2016), by leading scholar
  Budiansky, Stephen. Air Power: The Men, Machines & Ideas That Revolutionized War, from Kitty Hawk to Gulf War II  (2004) 495p. scholarly history 1900 to 1999. 
 Daso, Dik Alan. Hap Arnold and the Evolution of American Airpower (2001) excerpt and text search
 Higham, Robin and Mark Parillo, eds. The Influence of Airpower Upon History: Statesmanship, Diplomacy, and Foreign Policy Since 1903 (University Press of Kentucky; 2013) 137 pages; essays on the use of airpower by Britain, France, Germany, Russia, and other countries. excerpt and text search
 Gray, Colin Spencer. Understanding Airpower, AFRI: Maxwell, March 2009.
 Jordan, David. "Air and Space Warfare", in: Jordan, David et al.: Understanding Modern Warfare (Cambridge University Press 2009), pp. 182–223, .
 Meilinger, Philip S. Ten Propositions Regarding Airpower (1993) online
 Meilinger, Philip S. ed. The Paths of Heaven: The Evolution of Airpower Theory (2012)
 Mueller, Karl P. Air Power (RAND Corporation, 2010) online
 Neocleous, Mark. "Air power as police power." Environment and Planning D: Society and Space 31.4 (2013): 578–593.
 Stokesbury,  James L.  A Short History of Air Power (1986)

Historiography
 Capra, James L. "Fighting with the air: airpower, violence, and public sentiment in irregular warfare" (MA thesis, Naval Postgraduate School Monterey United States, 2016) online
 Clodfelter, Mark. The Limits of Air Power: The American Bombing of North Vietnam (2006)
 Faber, Peter. "Competing Theories of Airpower: A Language for Analysis" online
 Hoffman, Bruce. British Air Power in Peripheral Conflict, 1919-1976 (RAND, 1989)   online.
 Meilinger, Phillip. "Military Theory: Airpower" in Charles Messenger, ed. Reader's Guide to Military History (2001) pp. 376–79 online
 Vallance, Andrew G.B. The air weapon: doctrines of air power strategy and operational art (1996).

External links
 US Air University online resources

Military strategy
Aerial warfare strategy